The Michigan State Spartans women's volleyball team was founded in 1972. They play home matches at the Breslin Center, which they moved to in 2022 after playing at Jenison Fieldhouse.

History

Carol Davis era
Carol Davis was the first Michigan State indoor volleyball coach in 1972 before being named the first women’s athletic director in the
history of the Big Ten.

Karen Peterson era
Karen Peterson was the second Michigan State indoor volleyball coach in 1973. She coached the team to a 6–11 record.

Annelies Knoppers era
Annelies Knoppers took over the head coaching position in 1974.

In her second year of coaching, Michigan State qualified for the Association of Intercollegiate Athletics for Women (AIAW) championships, one of 24 teams to be invited to the tournament. In the 1976 season, Knoppers' Spartans finished the season 35–6. They improved on their 1975 finish in the Midwest Regionals, this time securing a win. They were seeded eighth in the 24 team AIAW tournament.

Knoppers coached for 11 seasons, compiling a 250-197-18 record. She was the coach when the Big Ten Conference started sponsoring volleyball in 1983. She retired to pursue a teaching career.

Ginger Mayson era
Ginger Mayson started coaching the Spartans in 1985. She finished her career with an overall record of 67-181 and a Big Ten Conference record of 22–126 over eight seasons.

Chuck Erbe era
Chuck Erbe was the first male head coach of the Michigan State women's volleyball team, coaching for 12 seasons. His teams participated in the NCAA tournament in ten of those seasons. Their overall record under Erbe was 244-140, with a Big Ten record of 140-100. Erbe was inducted into the AVCA Hall of Fame.

Cathy George era
Cathy George began coaching the team in 2005. She led the Spartans to 10 NCAA Tournament Appearances. She retired at the end of the 2021 season as the winningest coach in program history, leading the Spartans to a 302–233 record.

Leah Johnson era
Leah Johnson is the current head coach, having been hired in 2022. Before coaching the Spartans, she was the head volleyball coach for the Illinois State Redbirds.

References

 
Michigan State Spartans
1973 establishments in Michigan
Volleyball clubs established in 1973